The Sunbeam 1000 HP Mystery, or "The Slug",  is a land speed record-breaking car built by the Sunbeam car company of Wolverhampton that was powered by two aircraft engines. It was the first car to travel at over 200 mph. The car's last run was a demonstration circuit at Brooklands, running at slow speed on only one engine. It is today on display at the National Motor Museum, Beaulieu.

Design
Louis Coatalen's Automobiles Talbot-Darracq team was short of funds and so little new development was possible. The engines were a pair of Sunbeam Matabele 22.4 litre aircraft engines, previously used in a powerboat. Although best known as the "1000 HP" car, its actual power was closer to 900 hp (670 kW). One engine was mounted ahead of the driver, one behind. The rear engine was started first by compressed air, then the front engine was started through a mechanical friction clutch. Once synchronised, they were locked together with a dog clutch for the record attempt.

The car was designed by Captain Jack Irving, having new features such as all-enveloping bodywork that assisted aerodynamics. The car also had specially-made tyres capable of withstanding 200 mph, although only rated for 3½ minutes at these speeds. One more primitive feature was the final drive to the rear axle using a pair of chains. Only weeks before the record attempt, it was speculated that J. G. Parry-Thomas had been decapitated when a similar chain in his car Babs had broken at speed. Later investigation of the recovered wreckage suggested instead that the rear right-hand wheel had failed, overturning Babs. Although the Sunbeam's chains were enclosed below an armoured steel housing, these covers had been designed from the beginning, they were not added after Parry-Thomas' accident.

Record
The Sunbeam 1000 HP was the first non-American car to run on Daytona Beach for a land speed record attempt. On 29 March 1927, Henry Segrave drove the car to a new land speed record of 203.79 miles per hour (327.97 km/h), the first car to reach a speed over 200 mph (320 km/h).

See also
 Silver Bullet (car)

References

Bibliography

Notes

External links

 Contemporary cut-away side illustration, possibly from The Autocar
 
 
 National Motor Museum, Beaulieu

Wheel-driven land speed record cars
1000 hp
Cars powered by aircraft engines